This is a list of dreadnought battleships of the Royal Navy of the United Kingdom.

The launch of Dreadnought in 1906 prompted an arms race with major strategic consequences, as countries built their own dreadnoughts. Possession of modern battleships was not only vital to naval power, but also represented a nation's standing in the world. Germany, France, the Russian Empire, Japan, Italy, Austria-Hungary, and the United States all began dreadnought programmes; second-rank powers including the Ottoman Empire, Argentina, Brazil, and Chile commissioned dreadnoughts to be built in British and American shipyards.

The Royal Navy at the start of the First World War was the largest navy in the world due, in the most part, to The Naval Defence Act 1889 formalising the adoption of the "two-power standard" which called for the navy to maintain a number of battleships at least equal to the combined strength of the next two largest navies. The majority of the Royal Navy's strength was deployed at home in the Grand Fleet, with the primary aim of drawing the German High Seas Fleet into an engagement. The capital ships of the Royal Navy and the German Imperial Navy did come into contact on occasions, notably in the Battle of Jutland, but there was no decisive naval battle where one fleet came out the victor.

The inter-war period saw the battleship subjected to strict international limitations to prevent a costly arms race breaking out. Faced with the prospect of a naval arms race against Great Britain and Japan, which would in turn have led to a possible Pacific war, the United States was keen to conclude the Washington Naval Treaty of 1922. This treaty limited the number and size of battleships that each major nation could possess, and required Britain to accept parity with the U.S. and to abandon the British alliance with Japan. The Washington treaty was followed by a series of other naval treaties to limit warship size and numbers, concluding with the Second London Naval Treaty in 1936. These treaties became effectively obsolete on 1 September 1939 at the beginning of Second World War.

The treaty limitations meant that fewer new battleships were launched from 1919–1939 than from 1905–1914. The treaties also inhibited development by putting maximum limits on the weights of ships and forced the Royal Navy into compromise designs for the Nelson and King George V classes. Designs like the projected British N3-class battleship continued the trend to larger ships with bigger guns and thicker armour, but never got off the drawing board. Those designs which were commissioned during this period were referred to as treaty battleships. After the Second World War, the Royal Navy's four surviving King George V-class ships were scrapped in 1957 and Vanguard followed in 1960. All other surviving British battleships had been sold or broken up by 1949.

Key

HMS Dreadnought

HMS Dreadnought was the first dreadnought battleship, a classification to which she gave her name, and was born out of the minds of Vittorio Cuniberti and First Sea Lord Admiral Sir John Fisher and the results of the Russo-Japanese War. She was the first large warship to use steam turbines, of which Dreadnought had two, from the Parsons company. Dreadnoughts primary armament was a suite of ten 45-calibre Mk X  guns, arranged in such a way that only eight of her main guns could fire a broadside, and a secondary armament of ten 50-calibre 12-pounder guns and five  torpedo tubes. Dreadnought sparked a naval arms race that soon had all the world's major powers building new and bigger warships in her image. Although her concepts would be improved upon for decades, Dreadnoughts construction set an unbeaten record of 15 months for the fastest construction of a battleship ever.

Dreadnought was then assigned to the 1st Division of the Home Fleet, and was present at the Fleet Review for the coronation King George V. In December 1912, the ship was transferred from the 1st Battle Squadron and became the flagship of the 4th Squadron until 10 December 1914. While patrolling the North Sea on 18 March 1915, she rammed and sank , becoming the only battleship to have sunk a submarine. Dreadnought did not participate in the Battle of Jutland as she was undergoing a refit. Two years later, she resumed her role as flagship of the 4th Squadron, but was moved into the reserve in February 1920 and sold for scrap on 9 May 1921. She was broken up 2 January 1923.

Bellerophon class

The sisters retained much of HMS Dreadnoughts design, such as her 45-calibre Mk X  guns and their arrangement, but had changes like the relocation of the foremast behind the forward funnel and an improved secondary armament. The thickness of the Bellerophons belt armour,  at its thickest, was an inch thinner than that of Dreadnoughts at her thickest.

Upon commissioning, all three ships were assigned to the 1st division of the Home Fleet, later the 1st Battle Squadron, and took part in the Coronation Review for King George V. From 17–20 July 1914, all three took part in the mobilisation and review of the Royal Navy during the July Crisis following the assassination of Archduke Ferdinand. Bellerophon and Superb joined the Home Fleet but Temeraire did not until 1915. All three ships participated in the Battle of Jutland, firing no more than 62 shells at the cruiser  and the battle cruiser , but without success. Later, Bellerophon served as the junior flagship of the 4th Squadron from June to September 1917 while its usual flagship was being refitted. Superb and Temeraire were transferred to the Mediterranean Fleet, where Superb served as fleet flagship until the armistice. After the war, the now obsolete ships were placed in reserve. Temeraire became a training vessel until decommissioned and scrapped in 1921, Bellerophon was made a gunnery ship in March 1919 at The Nore and was sold for scrap 8 November 1921 and broken up 14 September 1922, and Superb relieved Bellerophon as a gunnery training vessel and then served briefly as a target ship before sold for scrapping in December 1923.

St Vincent class

Upon commissioning, the St Vincent-class battleships were all assigned to the 1st Battle Squadron of the Home Fleet. The ships were present at the Coronation Review of King George V on 24 June 1911 and HMS Collingwood became the flagship of the 1st Squadron two days later. After a lengthy refit in mid-1914, the sisters participated in the mobilisation and British responses to the July Crisis and joined the Home Fleet at Scapa Flow on 22 July 1914. The three sisters inflicted little damage, despite firing 98 shots during the battle. After the battle, Collingwood and St Vincent joined their sister Vanguard in the 4th Squadron, who had been transferred there in April 1916, and continued to serve with the Home Fleet until the end of the war. On 9 July 1917, one of Vanguards magazines exploded, killing 840 of her crew and two Australian sailors aboard . After the war, St Vincent became a gunnery training ship March 1919, before being made the flagship of the Reserve Fleet in June. In December, she was relieved and then sold for scrap 1 December 1921. Collingwood was also assigned to the Reserve Fleet, briefly served as a training vessel, and then was also sold for scrap 12 December 1922.

HMS Neptune

HMS Neptune, the only ship of her class, was the only battleship constructed during the 1908–1909 Naval Programme, and was the first British battleship to use superfiring gun turrets. Her secondary weapons also made her unique from the preceding class, as her 50-calibre Mk VII  secondary guns did not have shielding in the superstructure, a first for British dreadnoughts.

HMS Neptune was commissioned on 19 January 1909. She replaced  as the flagship of the Home Fleet and of the 1st Division 25 March 1909, two weeks after the completion of sea trials. Neptune then participated in the Coronation review of King George V, was replaced as the Home Fleet's flagship by  10 March 1914, and then participated in the British naval response to the July Crisis from 17–20 July 1914. After Jutland, she was transferred to the 4th Battle Squadron and never again saw combat. Neptune was placed in the reserve 1 February 1919 and sold for scrap in September 1922.

Colossus class

The Colossus class retained the same two Parsons steam turbines and their four shafts and the top speed of  they produced and the same ten 50-calibre Mk XI  main guns and 50-calibre Mk VII  secondary guns of the previous classes of British dreadnoughts.

Upon commission, Colossus and Hercules were both assigned to the 2nd Division, renamed the 2nd Battle Squadron 1 May 1912, of the Home Fleet and Hercules became its flagship. Colossus was transferred to the 1st Squadron by the end of the year, and Hercules temporarily became a private ship in 1913 but later also joined the 1st Squadron. Before the First World War, Hercules had a collision with a merchant ship in Portland Harbour. After the battle, both ships were transferred into the 4th Squadron, Colossus becoming second-in-command, and entered another period of relative inactivity. Both ships were present at the surrender of the German fleet at Rosyth, Scotland on 21 November, and Hercules took the Allied Naval Armistice Commission to Kiel, Germany, then joined the Reserve Fleet in February 1919 a month after her sister ship had briefly become flagship. Colossus was for a time listed for scrapping, but was then made a boys' training vessel in September 1921 and was refitted. Colossus was then returned to the list the following year, but was once again removed and hulked for use by the training establishment HMS Impregnable and was finally sold for scrap in August 1928, with Hercules having preceded her on 8 November 1921.

Orion class

The Orion class was the first to use a larger caliber main battery, with ten 45-calibre Mk V  main guns on the centreline in superfiring gun turrets, an idea taken from the American  battleships. The sisters were larger and more powerful than the first generation of British dreadnoughts.

All four sister ships were assigned to the 2nd Battle Squadron of the Home Fleet upon commission and Orion was named its flagship. The sisters then participated in the Fleet review at Spithead on 9 July 1914 and in the mobilisation of the Royal Navy during the July Crisis and following assembly at Scapa Flow. The sisters were four of the six dreadnoughts assigned to intercept the German fleet responsible for the 16 December raid on the northeast English coast. On 27 December 1914, Conqueror rammed her sister ship Monarch as the Grand Fleet was returning to Scapa Flow, damaging both vessels. All four warships were present at the Battle of Jutland. Conqueror and Thunderer made no hits, while Monarch and Orion struck  and  once each and  five times between them; none of the four fired more than 57 of their primary shells during the entire battle. When on 21 November 1918 the German fleet surrendered at Rosyth, Scotland, the sisters were present. In February 1919, they were transferred to the 3rd Squadron and Orion retained her status as squadron flagship. By the end of 1919 the sisters were all transferred into the Reserve Fleet, but Monarch was transferred to Portsmouth in early 1920. In the summer of that year, Thunderer and Monarch were recommissioned to ferry troops to and from the Mediterranean Sea, and Orion joined Monarch at Portsmouth later in the year and became the flagship of the Reserve Fleet before being relieved in this duty by Conqueror in mid-1921 to once again ferry troops. In 1921, Thunderer and Orion were transformed into training vessels and were sold for scrap the following year in accordance with the Washington Naval Treaty. Monarch was hulked and used for weapons testing until finally sunk in 1925. Thunderer, the last of the sisters, was sold for scrap in 1926.

King George V class (1911)

All four of the King George V-class ships were assigned to the 2nd Battle Squadron on commission, King George V becoming the Squadron's flagship by 18 February 1913, but Centurion began her career early, accidentally ramming and sinking an Italian steamer with all hands. From 17 to 20 July 1914 the sister ships participated in the July Crisis test mobilisation and were shortly thereafter ordered to join the Home Fleet, soon the Grand Fleet, at Scapa Flow. King George V also went out of service for a brief time beginning in November 1914 because of a condenser malfunction. The surviving sisters participated in a sortie that set out to engage Franz von Hipper's raiding force after its attack on three coastal British towns in December 1914, but did not see combat. At the Battle of Jutland nearly two years later, the sisters did see combat but none of them fired more than 19 shells, all without effect due to poor visibility. The sisters participated in the Royal Navy's subsequent war time actions and were present at the surrender of the German fleet at Rosyth on 21 November 1918. Into early 1919, the sisters remained with the 2nd Squadron, until King George V was moved to the 3rd Squadron and then became the flagship of the Reserve Fleet until 1920 when the 3rd Squadron was disbanded. She was refitted and reassigned to the 4th Squadron the same year, then in 1923 became a gunnery training vessel before finally being sold for scrap in December 1926. Ajax met the same fate, but was sold for scrap on 9 November 1926. The last of the King George V-class ships, Centurion was converted into a target ship, but was remilitarised in 1941 with light weapons and dummy main guns. On 9 June 1944, she was sunk as a block ship to defend a mulberry harbor established on Omaha Beach.

Iron Duke class

New for British dreadnoughts, the four Iron Duke-class sisters were fairly separated from each other in their careers. On completion, Iron Duke joined the Royal Navy's Home Fleet as its new flagship, Marlborough followed her into the Home Fleet as the flagship of Lewis Bayly. Both ships were completed within two months before the start of World War I and were soon reorganized into the Grand Fleet, of which Iron Duke remained the flagship while Marlborough was assigned to the 1st Battle Squadron as Admiral John Jellicoe's flagship. At this time, Benbow and Emperor of India were completed and assigned to the 4th Battle Squadron, the latter as the flagship of the second division and the former of the whole squadron, and the sisters all had their casemates sealed and rearmost secondary guns removed. All the sisters but Emperor of India, in dock for refits, were present for the Battle of Jutland and fought with distinction. Marlborough and Benbow struggled with poor visibility, the former firing seven salvos at a group of s and the latter firing six salvos, both without effect. When fighting around  resumed, all three sisters participated but without any hits on the torpedo boats around the disabled cruiser. Marlborough eventually neutralised the Wiesbaden, sustaining extensive damage in the process, and also struck  three times with thirteen salvos. After the battle, Marlborough underwent three months of repairs and received increased armour plating, and Emperor of India rejoined the Home Fleet in the 1st Battle Squadron. In March 1919, the Iron Duke-class sisters were assigned to the 4th Battle Squadron with the Mediterranean Fleet to participate in the Allied intervention in the Russian Civil War in the Black Sea, Marlborough even carrying Maria Feodorovna, Grand Duke Nicholas, and Prince Yusupov, and then the sisters served in the Greco-Turkish War until Greece's defeat in the war in 1922, at which point Marlborough, Benbow, and Emperor of India underwent refitting at different ports. Benbow relieved Iron Duke for a major refit of her own in May 1928, then was decommissioned and sold for scrap in March 1931. Marlborough and Emperor of India followed her the next year after being used as target ships, sold for scrap in February and June 1932, respectively. Iron Duke survived into World War II, serving at Scapa Flow as a floating anti-aircraft battery and was twice attacked and heavily damaged by Luftwaffe Junkers Ju 88s, and was refloated after the war and then sold for scrap in March 1946.

HMS Agincourt

HMS Agincourt was laid down in Newcastle upon Tyne in 1911 as the Brazilian battleship Rio de Janeiro, but was sold to the Ottoman Empire in December 1913, named Sultân Osmân-ı Evvel, and was seized by the British government and given her final name when Turkey entered the First World War for the Central Powers.

After being commissioned into the Royal Navy on 7 August 1914, Agincourt joined the Grand Fleet's 4th Battle Squadron on 7 September 1914 but was reassigned to the 1st Battle Squadron on 31 May 1916, just in time for the Battle of Jutland. After being transferred to the 2nd Battle Squadron, Agincourt was present for the surrender of the High Seas Fleet and was then placed in reserve in March 1919. The Brazilian government was not interested in purchasing her, so Agincourt was listed for disposal and then sold for scrap on 19 December 1922 in accordance with the Washington Naval Treaty.

HMS Erin

She had Krupp  armour belt and was equipped with ten 45-calibre Mk VI  guns, similar to the King George V class's main guns, but had the 's sixteen 50-calibre Mk XVI  secondary guns.

On 29 July 1914, Reşadiye was seized under the orders of First Lord of the Admiralty Winston Churchill, and on the 31st it entered the Royal Navy as HMS Erin. She joined the Grand Fleet's 4th Battle Squadron on 5 September of the same year and participated in the fleet's early war sorties and drills, most importantly in response to the German attack on Scarborough, Hartlepool and Whitby. At some point from September to December 1915, Erin was transferred to the 2nd Battle Squadron. She participated in the Battle of Jutland, but was hindered by poor visibility and was the only British capital ship to not fire her main battery guns and only fired six 6-inch shells. After Jutland, Erin returned to active participation in the Grand Fleet's North Sea operations, sortieing against High Seas Fleet raids on merchant convoys and at the end of war was present for the surrender of the High Seas Fleet at Rosyth, Scotland on 21 November 1918. On 1 May 1919, Erin was assigned to the Home Fleet's 3rd Battle Squadron, but entered the reserves at Portland Harbour in October at the Nore. From July to August 1920 Erin underwent a refit as a gunnery practice ship, but came to be in violation of the Washington Naval Treaty of 1922 and was sold for scrap on 19 December 1922.

HMS Canada

In 1911, Chile ordered two battleships, Almirante Latorre and Almirante Cochrane (later ) from the Armstrong Whitworth company. She was also more heavily armed, sporting ten 45-calibre  main guns and sixteen 50-calibre Mk XI  secondary guns, but lightly armoured with only  on her belt, making her an oddity in the Royal Navy. Her propulsion means was also unusual for British battleships.

On 9 September 1914, the British government purchased Almirante Latorre from Chile and christened her HMS Canada and undertook some minor alterations. She was commissioned on 15 October 1915, and assigned to the 4th Battle Squadron. Canada was transferred to the 1st Battle Squadron on 12 June 1916 and subsequently underwent more modification, and was placed in the reserves in March 1919. In April of the next year, she was sold back to Chile and resumed her original name.

Queen Elizabeth class

They had a main armament of eight  main guns arranged in four twin turrets. The new calibre guns were intended to still give the Royal Navy an advantage in range over newer American and Japanese ships which the Admiralty expected were to be armed with 14-inch guns. Secondary armament was fourteen 6-inch, two 3-inch anti-aircraft and four 21-inch torpedoes tubes.

Revenge class

The Revenge class (sometimes known as the Royal Sovereign class) were designed as a cheaper alternative to the Queen Elizabeth class. Plans had initially been for a class of eight ships, but at the start of the First World War work stopped on all new capital ships. The last three ships Renown, Repulse and Resistance were cancelled. The first two of these were eventually redesigned as battlecruisers. However, in 1915, this was changed and they became oil-fuelled only. Secondary armament was fourteen 6-inch, two 3-inch anti-aircraft, four 3-pounder guns and four 21-inch torpedoes. Both Revenge and Royal Oak were completed in time to take part in the Battle of Jutland. Royal Oak was torpedoed at anchor in the supposedly safe harbour of Scapa Flow soon after the start of Second World War.

N3 class

The N3, like the contemporary G3-class battlecruiser design, were planned in response to other nations' intentions to build superior navies. The design concentrated the main guns forward of the bridge to reduce weight while allowing very thick armour over the critical parts but they would still be about twice the displacement of predecessors. The design was approved in 1921 but in 1922 the major naval powers agreed the Washington Naval Treaty to limit the size and number of warships in their navies. The treaty set an upper limit of 35,000 tons displacement and 16-inch guns; the ships had not been ordered and no construction had been started.

Nelson class

The two ships of the Nelson class were the only new battleships the Royal Navy were allowed to build under the terms of the Washington Naval Treaty. The layout was based on that of the N3 battleship and G3 battlecruiser but further reduced to come under the weight limit. Nine BL 16 inch Mk I guns – the same as were to have been used on the G3 battlecruisers – were carried in three forward turrets. Secondary armament was twelve 6-inch guns mounted in six turrets at the rear of the ship, six  anti-aircraft guns, seven eight-barrelled 2-pounder "pompom" mountings, four quadruple 40 mm Bofors guns and sixty five 20 mm Oerlikon cannon.

King George V class (1939)

The King George V class of ships were criticized for having 14-inch main guns (the preceding Nelson class had larger, though relatively lighter 16 inch guns). The decision to use 14-inch guns was taken in October 1935, while the United Kingdom was negotiating for a continuation of the Naval Treaties with the other parties to the London Treaty. The British Government favoured a reduction in the maximum gun calibre to 14 inches and, in early October, the government learned that the United States would support this position if the Japanese could also be persuaded to do so. Since the large guns needed to be ordered by the end of the year in order for ships to enter service on time, the British Admiralty decided on 14-inch guns for the King George V class. The guns were arranged in three turrets, two with four and one (behind and above the forward turret) with two guns. Secondary armament was sixteen QF 5.25-inch Mk I guns, four eight-barrelled 2-pounder "pom-pom" anti-aircraft mountings (King George V and Prince of Wales the later ships all had six mountings). Anson and Howe had eighteen Oerlikon 20 mm cannon and the Duke of York six. They were all fitted with amidships catapults for the three Supermarine Walrus spotter/patrol aircraft they carried. The King George V class were designed to reach a speed of over 27 knots. As the treaty negotiations collapsed, this lack of speed and the smaller size of their main armament left them slower and with a lesser broadside than foreign battleships that were being produced around the same time.

Lion class

During the Second London Naval Treaty of 1936, the upper limit for battleships was agreed by the powers attending but an escalator clause allowed for increases if parties defaulted. The Admiralty had planned to scrap the ineffective Revenge class when the King George V ships entered service. These plans were soon changed, the Admiralty's new ambition was to raise a battle fleet of 20 ships, 15 of them to match the new standard, keeping the Revenge class until at least 1942. To meet this target the navy wanted three battleships added to the 1938 plans, but in the end only two were given the go ahead and even then they had to use reserve slipways, normally only used in emergencies. At the same time it was identified that unless the 1938 ships were completed by 1942, the Royal Navy between 1940 and 1943 would be at a disadvantage with only twelve modern and eight older battleships against a combined German–Japanese fleet of twenty modern ships. Construction work was halted at start of war so that resources could be diverted to more important production and although design was revised during war no further work took place.

HMS Vanguard

 was the final Royal Navy battleship. She was armed with eight 42-calibre  main guns, taken from the  battlecruisers, and sixteen 50-calibre dual-purpose  secondary guns.  of Krupp armour made up the waterline belt protected -long Vanguard.

See also

 List of battleships
 List of ironclads of the Royal Navy
 List of pre-dreadnought battleships of the Royal Navy
 List of battlecruisers of the Royal Navy

Notes

Footnotes

Citations

References

Further reading

External links
 
 

Battleships
 
Royal Navy
Royal Navy